The Texas Department of Licensing and Regulation (TDLR) is a state agency of Texas.

TDLR is responsible for licensing and regulating a broad range of occupations, businesses, facilities, and equipment in Texas.

TDLR has its headquarters in the Ernest O. Thompson State Office Building in Downtown Austin.

Occupations Licensed by TDLR
Air Conditioning and Refrigeration
Architectural Barriers (however, architects themselves are regulated by a separate professional board)
Auctioneers
Barbering
Behavior Analysts
Boiler Safety
Combative Sports (i.e., boxing and mixed martial arts)
Cosmetologists
Dietitians
Driver Education and Safety
Dyslexia Therapists and Practitioners
Electricians
Elevator / Escalator Safety
For-Profit Legal Services (however, the State Bar of Texas regulates attorneys)
Hearing Instrument Fitters and Dispensers
Industrialized Housing and Buildings
Licensed Breeders
Midwives
Orthotists and Prosthetists
Podiatry
Polygraph Examiners
Property Tax Consultants
Property Tax Professionals
Service Contract Providers
Speech-Language Pathologists and Audiologists
Temporary Common Worker Providers
Tow Trucks, Operators and Vehicle Storage Facilities
Transportation Network Companies
Used Automotive Parts Recyclers
Vehicle Protection Product Warrantors
Water Well Drillers and Pump Installers
Weather Modification

References

External links

 Texas Department of Licensing and Regulation

State agencies of Texas